William G. Whitton (February 8, 1919 – November 1, 2007) was an American football player and coach. He served as the head football coach at the College of the Holy Cross in Worcester, Massachusetts from 1969 to 1970, compiling a record of 0–12–1. His time at Holy Cross was hampered by a rampant "mini-plague" that forced the cancellation of most of the 1969 season.

Whitton was born in Lanark, Scotland and grew up in Tarrytown, New York. A longtime resident of Plainfield, New Jersey, he died at the age of 88, on November 1, 2007, at Muhlenberg Regional Medical Center in Plainfield.

Head coaching record

References

1919 births
2007 deaths
High school football coaches in New Jersey
Holy Cross Crusaders football coaches
Lehigh Mountain Hawks football coaches
Princeton Tigers football coaches
St. Lawrence Saints football players
Sportspeople from Lanark
Sportspeople from Westchester County, New York
People from Plainfield, New Jersey
People from Tarrytown, New York
Players of American football from New York (state)
British emigrants to the United States